Matías Médici (born June 29, 1975 in Ciudadela, Buenos Aires) is a former Argentine professional track and road cyclist. He represented his native country at the 2008 Summer Olympics in Beijing, PR China.

Doping 
Médici tested positive for EPO at the 2012 Rutas de América and received a two-year suspension for doping.

Major results

2003
 1st Prologue Rutas de América
 Vuelta del Uruguay
1st Stages 5 & 8 (ITT)
 3rd Time trial, National Road Championships
2004
 1st Overall Rutas de América
1st Stage 7b (ITT)
 1st Overall Tour de Santa Catarina
1st Prologue & Stage 8b (ITT)
 3rd Time trial, National Road Championships
 6th Overall Volta do Paraná
 6th Overall Vuelta del Uruguay
1st Stages 5 & 8 (ITT)
2005
 1st Overall Rutas de América
1st Stage 7b
 1st Stage 2b (ITT) Volta de Porto Alegre
 1st Prologue Tour de Santa Catarina
 2nd Overall Volta de Ciclismo Internacional do Estado de São Paulo
 9th Time trial, UCI Road World Championships
2006
 1st  Time trial, South American Games
 1st  Time trial, National Road Championships
 1st Overall Doble Bragado
1st Stage 6a
 5th Overall Vuelta Ciclista de Chile
1st Prologue
 8th Time trial, Pan American Road Championships
 8th Overall Volta de Ciclismo Internacional do Estado de São Paulo
1st Stage 6 (ITT)
2007
 1st Overall Volta do Rio de Janeiro
1st Stage 2 (ITT)
 1st Stage 6a (ITT) Clásica del Oeste-Doble Bragado
 1st Stage 1 Tour de Santa Catarina
 2nd  Time trial, Pan American Games
 3rd Overall Volta de Ciclismo Internacional do Estado de São Paulo
 6th Overall Tour de San Luis
 9th Overall Vuelta por un Chile Líder
2008
 1st  Time trial, National Road Championships
 1st Clasica 1° de Mayo
 Vuelta a Mendoza
1st Stages 6 & 8
 1st Stage 9a Vuelta del Uruguay
 1st Stage 1 Volta das Satélites
 Pan American Road Championships
2nd  Time trial
5th Road race
 3rd Volta Inconfidencia Mineira
 3rd Copa Recife Speed Bike
2009
 1st Overall 500 Millas del Norte
1st Stage 5
 2nd Time trial, National Road Championships
 2nd Overall Vuelta a San Juan
1st Stage 3
 3rd  Time trial, Pan American Road Championships
 5th Overall Volta de Ciclismo Internacional do Estado de São Paulo
 8th Overall Giro del Sol San Juan
2010
 1st  Time trial, National Road Championships
 1st Stage 5 Volta do Paraná
 4th Time trial, Pan American Road Championships
2011
 2nd  Time trial, Pan American Games
 2nd Time trial, National Road Championships
 9th Overall Rutas de América
2012
1st  Time trial, Pan American Road Championships
3rd Overall Rutas de América
1st Stage 4b (ITT)
2015
 2nd Time trial, National Road Championships
2016
 5th Overall Vuelta del Uruguay
 8th Overall Volta Ciclística Internacional do Rio Grande do Sul

References

External links
 

1975 births
Living people
Argentine male cyclists
Doping cases in cycling
Argentine sportspeople in doping cases
Argentine track cyclists
Cyclists at the 2007 Pan American Games
Cyclists at the 2008 Summer Olympics
Cyclists at the 2011 Pan American Games
Olympic cyclists of Argentina
Pan American Games silver medalists for Argentina
Vuelta Ciclista de Chile stage winners
Sportspeople from Buenos Aires Province
Pan American Games medalists in cycling
South American Games silver medalists for Argentina
South American Games medalists in cycling
Competitors at the 2006 South American Games
Medalists at the 2007 Pan American Games
Medalists at the 2011 Pan American Games
21st-century Argentine people